Ali Beyglu or Alibeyglu, also rendered as Alibeglu, may refer to:
 Ali Beyglu, Meyaneh, East Azerbaijan Province
 Ali Beyglu, Shabestar, East Azerbaijan Province
 Ali Beyglu, Miandoab, West Azerbaijan Province
 Alibeyglu, Urmia, West Azerbaijan Province
 Ali Beygluy (disambiguation)